This is a list of casinos in Pennsylvania.

List of casinos

</onlyinclude>

Mini casinos 
In early 2018 auctions began for licenses of Category 4 mini casinos, otherwise known as satellite casinos. Although ten licenses were available, only five were sold. The following mini-casinos are planned or under construction:
Unnamed casino, Ira Lubert, near State College

Never opened casinos
Foxwoods Casino Philadelphia, Philadelphia
Market 8, Philadelphia
Mount Airy Pittsburgh, Big Beaver

Gallery

See also

List of casinos in the United States 
List of casino hotels
Gambling in Pennsylvania
Pennsylvania Gaming Control Board

References

External links

Pennsylvania
Casinos